Gheorghe Doja is a commune in Mureș County, Transylvania, Romania composed of five villages:
Gheorghe Doja / Lukafalva
Ilieni / Lukailencfalva
Leordeni / Lőrincfalva
Satu Nou / Teremiújfalu
Tirimia / Nagyteremi

History
The locality was mentioned for the first time in 1409 as Lucafalva. During its history, there were several military raids carried out against the village which also sustained a lot from flooding.  After the break-up of Austria-Hungary at the end of World War I and the Hungarian–Romanian War of 1918–19, the village became part of the Kingdom of Romania, under the name Luca. As a result of the Second Vienna Award it became a part of the Kingdom of Hungary between 1940 and 1945. Since then Gheorghe Doja has been part of Romania. In 1952, it was named after György Dózsa, who led a peasants' revolt against landed nobility at the beginning of the 16th century.

Demographics
The commune has an absolute Hungarian majority. In 1910, it had a population of 713 Hungarians. According to the 2011 census, Gheorghe Doja has a population of 2,982, of which 72.74% are Hungarians, 20.69% are Romanians, and 5% are Roma.

See also 
 List of Hungarian exonyms (Mureș County)

References

Communes in Mureș County
Localities in Transylvania